Amrit Sanchar (pronunciation: , lit. ‘nectar ceremony’; also called Amrit Parchar, or Khande di Pahul ਖੰਡੇ ਦੀ ਪਾਹੁਲ) is one of the four Sikh Sanskaars. The Amrit Sanskar is the initiation rite introduced by Guru Gobind Singh when he founded the Khalsa in 1699.

A Sikh who has been initiated into the Khalsa ('pure'; the Sikh brotherhood) is considered to be Amritdhari  (Baptised) or Khalsa ('pure'). Those who undergo initiation are expected to dedicate themselves to Waheguru (Almighty God) and work toward the establishment of the Khalsa Raj.

History
Amrit Sanchar was initiated in 1699 when Gobind Singh established the order of the Khalsa at Anandpur Sahib. The day is now celebrated as Vaisakhi. This tradition had come to replace the prior Sikh initiation ceremony, in which the initiate would drink water that the Guru or a masand (designated official representing the Guru) had dipped his foot in.

Guru Gobind Singh addressed the congregation from the entryway of a tent pitched on a hill (now called Kesgarh Sahib). He drew his sword and asked for a volunteer who was willing to sacrifice his head. No one answered his first call, nor the second call, but on the third invitation, a man by the name of Daya Ram (later to be known as Daya Singh) came forward and offered his head to the Guru. Guru Gobind Singh took the volunteer inside the tent, and emerged shortly, with blood dripping from his sword. The Guru then demanded another head. One more volunteer came forward, and entered the tent with him. The Guru again emerged with blood on his sword. This happened three more times. Then the five volunteers came out of the tent unharmed. Everyone was very confused.

These five men came to be known as the Panj Pyare (the "beloved five"). The five men, who would be initiated into the Khalsa by receiving Amrit, included Daya Singh, Mukham Singh, Sahib Singh, Dharam Singh, and Himmat Singh. From then onward, Sikh men were given the name Singh ("lion"), and the women Kaur ("princess").

Ceremony

According to the Irish-Sikh writer Max Arthur Macauliffe:

The Guru caused his five faithful Sikhs to stand up. He put pure water into an iron vessel and stirred it with a khanda or two edged sword. He then repeated over it the sacred verses which he appointed for the ceremony, namely, the Japji, the Jaap, Guru Amar Das's Anand, and certain swaiyas or quatrains of his own composition.

Rules of the ceremony include

Being conducted in any quiet and convenient place. In addition to the Guru Granth Sahib, the presence of six Sikhs is necessary: one granthi ("narrator"), who reads from the holy text, and five others, representing the original five beloved disciples (pyare), to administer the ceremony.
Taking a bath and washing of the hair prior to the ceremony is mandatory by those who are receiving the initiation and those who are administering.
Any Sikh who is mentally and physically sound (male or female) may administer the rites of initiation if they have received the rites and continue to adhere to the Sikh rehni ("way of life") and wear the Sikh articles of faith (i.e. the Five Ks).
There is no minimum age requirement, though it is rare for younger children since the individual should be able to understand the implications of initiation.
The person to become Amritdhari must wear the five holy symbols (the Five Ks): 
Kesh (unshorn hair)
Kirpan ("sword", i.e. a small dagger worn on the person)
Kachehra (prescribed boxer shorts)
Kangha (comb tucked in the tied-up hair)
Karha (steel bracelet)
He/she must not have on his/her person any jewellery, distinctive marks, or tokens associated with any other faith. He/she must not have his/her head bare or be wearing a cap. The head must be covered with a cloth. He/she must not be wearing any ornaments piercing through any part of the body. The persons to be Amritdhari must stand respectfully with hands folded facing the Guru Granth Sahib.
Anyone seeking re-initiation after having resiled from their previous vows may be assigned a penance by the five administering initiation before being re-admitted.
During the ceremony, one of the five pyare stands and explains the rules and obligations of the Khalsa Panth.
Those receiving initiation have to give their assent as to whether they are willing to abide by the rules and obligations.
After their assent, one of the five pyare utters a prayer for the commencement of the preparation of the Amrit and a randomly selected passage (hukam, a "word of God") is taken from Sri Guru Granth Sahib.

The person being initiated must chant "Waheguru ji ka Khalsa, Waheguru ji ki fateh" (essentially meaning "Almighty Lord, the pure; Almighty Lord, the victorious"). The salutation is repeated and the holy water is sprinkled on their eyes and hair, five times. The remainder of the nectar is shared by all receiving the initiation, all drinking from the same bowl.

After this, all those taking part in the ceremony recite the Mool Mantra and they are inducted into the Khalsa.

Gallery

References

External links
Amrit Ceremony
All About Sikhs
Glossary
Eliminating Doubt's before/after Take Amrit (Katha in Punjabi)

Sikh practices
Dasam Granth